Amy Shindler is a British actress and television writer best known for her portrayal of Brenda Tucker in the UK’s long running soap opera, The Archers. She joined the programme shortly after leaving drama school and played Brenda Tucker until her departure from Ambridge in 2014. Brenda was notable in the show for her struggles with her boss, Matt Crawford, her long engagement to Tom Archer and her decision not to have children in order to devote herself to her career. Shindler has also appeared in the feature film, A Mighty Heart playing Michelle Pearl, and as Charlotte Fox in the feature film Everest.

Shindler’s television writing career began on the hit BBC1 comedy, My Family. Since then she has had her own sitcom series Pat and Cabbage on ITV1 with sometime writing partner, Beth Chalmers, and has written on comedies such as Threesome, Trollied and Horrible Histories. She and Chalmers are the creators, writers and executive producers of three series of the award-winning New Zealand based drama, Mystic, broadcast on CBBC in 2021 and 2022. The series has sold in over 40 countries worldwide.

Shindler is also an author and playwright. In 2012 she was invited on BBC Radio 4’s Loose Ends to discuss an erotic spoof book, Fifty Shelves of Grey, which she co-authored with three other writers under the pseudonym, ‘Vanessa Parody’.

In September 2016 her first play, Burning Bridges, was premiered at Theatre 503. The play drew the attention of the press for its timely exploration of a young woman with Asperger Syndrome and was nominated for three Offie Awards including Best Play.

Shindler grew up in North London and then studied History at the University of Cambridge. She is the daughter of the author and historian, Colin Shindler and cousin of the  television producer, Nicola Shindler.

References

External links

British television writers
British radio actresses
Year of birth missing (living people)
Living people
21st-century British actresses
21st-century British women writers
21st-century British dramatists and playwrights
British women dramatists and playwrights
British women television writers
Alumni of the University of Cambridge
21st-century British screenwriters